Clark Lake is a small lake in Columbia Township in southern Jackson County in the U.S. state of Michigan.

Local towns and areas
Brooklyn (located east )  Population (2000) 1,176
Cement City (located south ) Population (2000) 452
Lake Columbia - located South 
Jackson (located north approximately ) Population (2000) City: 36,316 - Metro Area: 163,629
Napoleon (located north east ) Population (2000) 1,254

Local points of interest

Golf Courses

Golf Courses, parks and many other recreational activities surround the lake and provide a person with things to do year round.  Clark Lake is located near the Irish Hills, Michigan International Speedway and the downtown area of Brooklyn.  There are over 14 different challenging golf courses within  of Clark Lake.

State and local parks
 Vineyard Lake County Park
 Walter J. Hayes State Park
 Cambridge Junction Historic St. Park

Points of interest
 Michigan International Speedway
 Hidden Lake Gardens
 Irish Hills

See also
List of lakes in Michigan

References

Columbia
Bodies of water of Jackson County, Michigan